Bottineau Winter Park is a modest alpine ski area in the midwestern United States, nestled in the Turtle Mountains of north-central North Dakota.

The ski area operates four days a week:
Thursday: 4 pm – 9 pm
Friday:   12 pm – 9 pm
Saturday: 9 am – 5 pm
Sunday:   9 am – 5 pm

Annie's House
Tentatively, the new lodge will open in the summer of 2013, which will be a year-round facility. This chalet is in commemoration of Stanley native Ann Nicole Nelson (1971–2001), who worked for Cantor Fitzgerald on the 104th floor of Tower One of the World Trade Center.

Annie's House is a one-level,  ski lodge designed to accommodate the needs of skiers with both physical and cognitive disabilities from across North Dakota and neighboring Manitoba. Approximately 50% the public space in the new facility will support the adaptive ski program and needs of disabled skiers and their families. This will be the first facility in North Dakota focused on empowering disabled skiers and their families to enjoy outdoor sports during winter while also providing a year-round facility to accommodate other adaptive sports. It replaces the original lodge of 1969.

Annie's House will provide an integrated, adaptive ski facility and program to accommodate the special needs of disabled children and young adults with both cognitive disabilities such as autism, intellectual disability, and Down syndrome, and physical disabilities such as blindness, cerebral palsy, and spinal cord injuries. In addition, Annie's House will be designed to provide adaptive ski equipment and programs for wounded warriors who returned from Iraq and Afghanistan challenged with physical disabilities resulting from amputation and traumatic brain injury.

Attractions
 8 trails
 5 lifts – (1 triple chair, 4 surface, 2 Magic Carpet)
 night skiing - 100%
 snowmaking - 100%
 snow tube park
 rentals

References

External links

New York Says Thank You Foundation – projects
YouTube: Annie's House - 2014

Buildings and structures in Bottineau County, North Dakota
Ski areas and resorts in North Dakota
Tourist attractions in Bottineau County, North Dakota